Earth’s Call Fund is set up to be a financial catalyst aimed at finding and funding innovative solutions to the climate crisis. 

The fund is in partnership with Lever for Change, an affiliate of the MacArthur Foundation, which helps philanthropists source vetted high-impact philanthropic opportunities. Earth's Call Fund's mission is “Finding and funding innovative solutions to fight the climate crisis.”

History
The Fund's public launch was marked by a three-day conference (May 17 to 19, 2019) in Aspen, Colorado in the Benedict Music Tent at the Aspen Music Festival and School and accompanied by online live stream. Artists performing in the concert included The Alan Parsons Project, Colbie Caillat, Anthony Hamilton (musician), Mickey Hart, Patti LaBelle, and Ladysmith Black Mambazo led by conductor Cheche Alara. The concert event also featured visual effects by Batwin & Robin and the concert performance was directed by Scott Lochmus.

Leadership
The Fund was founded in 2018. Spike Buckley is co-founder, Michele Hunt serves as president, and Roberta Baskin serves as executive director.

References

External links

Foundations based in the United States
Non-profit organizations based in Colorado
Organizations established in 2016